Exposure is the debut studio album by American girl group Exposé, released on March 2, 1987, by Arista Records. It reached number 16 on the Billboard 200 and number 20 on the Top R&B/Hip-Hop Albums chart, and was certified double platinum by the Recording Industry Association of America (RIAA) in May 1990. The album spawned four top-ten singles on the Billboard Hot 100 chart, including "Seasons Change", which topped the chart in February 1988. Other successful singles were the breakthrough single "Come Go with Me" (number 5 U.S.), a re-recorded version of the song "Point of No Return" (number 5 U.S.), and "Let Me Be the One" (number 7 U.S.). This was the first debut album by a group to feature four top-10 entries on the Billboard Hot 100 – a feat Cyndi Lauper achieved as a solo artist with her 1983 album She's So Unusual.

When first released, the album featured the original 1984 recording of "Point of No Return", with lead vocals by Alé Lorenzo. On all subsequent versions, including its release on compact disc, the re-recording with Jeanette Jurado on lead is featured, which was also the single version released to radio several years after the original made its rounds on urban radio and in clubs. However, all pressings of the album feature the original 1985 recording of "Exposed to Love", with lead vocals by Alé Lorenzo.

Lead vocals of the majority of the album were sung by Jurado. Gioia Bruno and Ann Curless each sing lead on two tracks, with Bruno on "Let Me Be the One" and "December", and Curless on "Extra Extra" and "Love Is Our Destiny". On the track "I Know You Know", Jurado sings lead, then Bruno provides a soulful improvisation at the end.

Track listing

2015 Cherry Pop deluxe edition (bonus disc)
"Exposed to Love" (Extended Mix)
"Come Go with Me" (Extended Mix)
"Point of No Return" (Extended Mix)
"Let Me Be the One" (Extended Remix)
"Seasons Change" (Extended Mix)
"Come Go with Me" (Radio Mix)
"Point of No Return" (Crossover Mix)
"Let Me Be the One" ("Crossover" Mix)
"Seasons Change" (Crossover Mix)
"Point of No Return" (PWL UK Extended Mix)
"Let Me Be the One" (UK Remix)

Personnel

Exposé
Alé, Sandée, and Laurie Miller (original line-up): lead and backing vocals on "Point of No Return" (original version, first pressing), "Exposed to Love"; backing vocals on "Come Go With Me", "Point of No Return" (later pressings),"Let Me Be The One", "I Know You Know", "December", "Seasons Change", "You're the One I Need", "Extra Extra", "Love Is Our Destiny".
Ann Curless ("Extra Extra" and "Love Is Our Destiny"), Gioia Bruno ("Let Me Be the One", "I Know You Know" and "December"), Jeanette Jurado ("Come Go with Me", "Seasons Change", "Point of No Return", "I Know You Know" and "You're the One I Need"): lead and backing vocals on all other tracks

Musicians
Nestor Gomez: lead and rhythm guitar
George "Jet" Finess: lead guitar on "Point of No Return," "Exposed to Love", and "December"
Steve Grove: saxophone
Fro Sosa: keyboards, synthesizers, and synth solos
Lewis A. Martineé: keyboards, percussion and drum programming

Technical
Executive producers: Francisco J. Diaz (for Pantera Productions) and Ed Eckstine
Arranged and produced by Lewis A. Martineé for Pantera Productions
Recorded and engineered by Mike Couzzi & John Hagg
Assistant recording engineers: Carlos Santos, Terresa Verplanck, David Barton, Carlos Nieto, Frank Prinzel, Sam Safirstein, Victor Di Persia, Ernie Williams, Charles Dye and Barabara Milne
Mixed by Lewis A. Martineé and Chris Lord-Alge
Mastered by José Rodriguez

Charts

Weekly charts

Year-end charts

Certifications

References

1987 debut albums
Arista Records albums
Exposé (group) albums